Events from the year 2023 in the Netherlands.

Incumbents 

 Monarch: Willem-Alexander
 Prime Minister: Mark Rutte
 Speaker of the House of Representatives: Vera Bergkamp
 President of the Senate: Jan Anthonie Bruijn

Events

Scheduled 

 15 March  
 2023 Dutch provincial elections
 2023 Dutch water board elections
 2023 Dutch electoral college elections
 2023 Dutch island council elections
 30 May2023 Dutch Senate election

Deaths 
1 January - Bob Jongen, 95, footballer
4 January - Manfred Krikke, 90, cycling teammanager
8 January - Sietse Bosgra, 87, political activist
9 January - Simone Kramer, 83, author
12 January - Toos Grol-Overling, 91, politician
14 January - Lieuwe Westra, 40, cyclist
15 January - Jan Krol, 60, actor
15 January - Piet van Heusden, 93, cyclist
15 January - Fons Panis, 90, mayor
17 January - Cornelius Rogge, 90, artist
19 January - Rudy Englebert, 72, bassist
20 January - Arno van der Heyden, 61, comedian and actor
22 January - Lenie de Nijs, 83, swimmer
23 January - Peter Maas, 69, mayor
1 February - Hans Sleven, 86, footballer
4 February - Geert-Jan Laan, 79, journalist
6 February - Ger Thijs, 74, actor and director
7 February - Harry de Winter, 73, television producer and presenter, mesothelioma.
9 February - Marijke Merckens, 83, actress

References 

 
Netherlands
Netherlands
2020s in the Netherlands
Years of the 21st century in the Netherlands